Vice Admiral Bimal Verma, AVSM, ADC is a retired Flag Officer in the Indian Navy. He served as the 13th Commander-in-Chief, Andaman and Nicobar Command from 29 February 2016 to 1 December 2019.

Early life and education
Verma attended the Rashtriya Indian Military College (RIMC), Dehradun. He later attended the National Defence Academy where he was adjudged the Best Naval Cadet. His elder brother, Nirmal Kumar Verma also joined the Navy and rose to become the 20th Chief of the Naval Staff.

Career
Verma was commissioned into the Navy on 1 January 1980. He has done his specialisation in Communication and Electronic Warfare.

He has commanded the amphibious warfare ships INS Shardul and INS Magar, the destroyer INS Ranjit and the Guided missile destroyer INS Mysore.

Ashore, he has served as Principal Director Naval Operations and as the Naval attaché at the Embassy of India, Tehran, Iran.

As a flag officer, he served as Flag Officer Commanding Maharashtra and Gujarat Naval Area as well as Assistant Chief of Naval Staff for Information Warfare & Operations. After his promotion to the rank of vice admiral on 1 November 2012, he was appointed as the Chief of Staff, Eastern Naval Command where he coordinated the International Fleet Review 2016.

Awards and decorations

References

Living people
Indian Navy admirals
Rashtriya Indian Military College alumni
National Defence Academy (India) alumni
Recipients of the Ati Vishisht Seva Medal
Year of birth missing (living people)
Commanders-in-Chief, Andaman and Nicobar Command
Indian naval attachés